Lyan Cheng (born 16 June 1988) is a Taiwanese actress, model and singer. She is the best known for her lead role in 2013 romantic-comedy series Fabulous Boys alongside Jiro Wang, Hwang In Deok and Evan Yo.

TV series

Internet video
 Fell in love with Yahoo (愛上雅虎)
 36 cups of coffee (第36杯咖啡)
 direction mio-heart mio-心的方向)
 sym-white lover (白色情人)
 I love you in TOKYO (我愛你 in TOKYO)

MV
io - true (真實)
F.I.R - find my way
Freya Lim林凡- injured (重傷)
Denise Ho何韻詩- shallots (青蔥)
Denise Ho何韻詩- Aozora (青空)

References

Coffee sister Su Li Wen you are very familiar yet strange personality hotty ，gamebase 2012-04-26

External links
  Brokerage company's official website Lyan Cheng

1988 births
Taiwanese female models
Living people
Taiwanese film actresses